In functional analysis and related areas of mathematics, a Smith space is a complete compactly generated locally convex topological vector space  having a universal compact set, i.e. a compact set  which absorbs every other compact set  (i.e.  for some ).

Smith spaces are named after 
Marianne Ruth Freundlich Smith, who introduced them as duals to Banach spaces in some versions of duality theory for topological vector spaces. All Smith spaces are stereotype and are in the stereotype duality relations with Banach spaces:
 for any Banach space  its stereotype dual space  is a Smith space,

 and vice versa, for any Smith space  its stereotype dual space  is a Banach space.

Smith spaces are special cases of Brauner spaces.

Examples

 As follows from the duality theorems, for any Banach space  its stereotype dual space  is a Smith space.
 
 If  is infinite-dimensional, then no two of these topologies coincide. At the same time, for infinite dimensional  the space  is not barreled (and even is not a Mackey space if  is reflexive as a Banach space).
In the special case when  is endowed with a structure of a topological group the space  becomes a natural example of a stereotype group algebra.
 A Banach space  is a Smith space if and only if  is finite-dimensional.

See also
Stereotype space
Brauner space

Notes

References

 
 
 
 

Functional analysis
Topological vector spaces